Muhammad Siddiq Bin Durimi (born 27 May 1988) is a Singaporean professional footballer who currently plays for Geylang International in the S.League. He plays as a goalkeeper.

Career
Siddiq Durimi has played in the S.League and Singapore National Football League. Siddiq joined Geylang International in 2010, shortly before joining Home United in 2011.

However, he vanished under a mountain of debts, is back in the limelight - as one of 2011's 20 Manhunt finalists.

He then left the professional football scene and entered the semi-pro scene, by joining NFL side Admiralty in 2012. Siddiq returned to the Eagles at the end of 2013.

References

External links

1988 births
Living people
Singaporean footballers
Geylang International FC players
Association football goalkeepers
Home United FC players
Footballers at the 2010 Asian Games
Asian Games competitors for Singapore